Japanese singer and songwriter Miliyah Kato has released eleven studio albums, six compilation albums, two EPs, one remix album, one cover album, one tribute album, 51 singles, and 15 promotional singles. She has sold over 9  million records in Japan, making her one of the best-selling and most-downloaded artist in the country of all time. Kato has been named as "the charisma of the high school girls" and "the queen of the unrequited love songs" by several media. 

Kato's career began as the featured vocalist on Reggae Disco Rockers' song "Cherry Oh! Baby" in 2003. In October 2005, she released her debut album, Rose. It debuted at number two on the Oricon weekly albums chart and produced the singles "Never Let Go", "Yozora", "Beautiful", "Dear Lonely Girl", and "Jōnetsu". The latter two singles has been certified gold by the Recording Industry Association of Japan (RIAJ). Her second studio album, Diamond Princess (2007) was a moderate hit, peaking at number five on the Oricon and produced the singles "Sotsugyō", "Last Summer", "I Will", and "Eyes on You". In October 2007, Kato released "Lalala" featuring Wakadannna, which became her first top ten and double platinum-certified song. The song was later included on her third studio album Tokyo Star (2008), which produced the singles "Love Is...", "Lalala", "Futurecheka", and the double platinum single, "19 Memories". Kato's first compilation album, Best Destiny (2008) became her first number one hit, and was later certified platinum.

Her fourth studio album Ring (2009) marked Kato's commercial breakthrough, peaking at number two and selling over 380,000 copies nationwide. It produced the four singles, "Sayonara Baby", "Koi Shiteru", "20 -Cry-", and "Love Forever", all of which reached top ten on the Oricon chart. The collaborative single with Shota Shimizu, "Love Forever", became her first number-one single on the Billboard Japan Hot 100, and was later certified million in Japan. The promotional single from the album, "Aitai" topped on the RIAJ Digital Track Chart and was certified triple-platinum. As of June 2020, the ringtone of the song has sold over 3.3 million units nationwide. Kato's fifth studio album, Heaven was released in July 2010 and debuted atop on the Oricon chart. The album's first two singles, "Why" and "Bye Bye", both reached the top ten on the Oricon chart, whilst the third single "Last Love" was certified platinum, while peaking at number 13 on the Oricon chart. Kato's second collaborative single with Shota Shimizu, "Forever Love" was released in 2010 and reached number three on the Japan Hot 100. Kato released her second compilation album, M Best in August 2011, which debuted atop on the Oricon chart and became the 19th best-selling album in the year in Japan.

Kato's sixth studio album True Lovers (2012), which peaked at number two on the Oricon chart, produced five singles, including the two top-ten singles "Yūsha Tachi" and "Heart Beat". In February 2014, Kato released her seventh studio album, Loveland, which reached number three in Japan. The album's highest charting single was "Love/Affection", which peaked at number ten on the Japan Hot 100, whilst its second single "Lonely Hearts" has been certified gold in Japan. Kato released her first and last collaborative album with Shimizu, The Best in April 2014, which peaked at number four on the Oricon chart. The singles from the album has sold over 8 million digital units, including the ringtone sales. Kato's eighth studio album Liberty (2016) debuted at number four on the Oricon chart. The album produced four singles, including the two top-forty hits, "Shonen Shojo" and "Future Lover -Mirai Koibito-". Kato's ninth studio album Utopia was released in April 2017. The album peaked at number five in Japan and produced two singles "Saikouna Shiawase" and the Japanese theme song to the film Moana, "Dokomademo: How Far I'll Go", which peaked at number 12 on the Japan Hot 100. Kato's tenth studio album Femme Fatale (2018) reached number eight on the Oricon chart. The album produced two singles "Shinyaku Dear Lonely Girl" and "Romance". Kato's fourth compilation album M Best II was released in November 2019 and produced two singles, including the top-forty hit "Ai ga Furu". In October and November 2020, Kato released her first cover album and tribute album, Covers -Woman & Man- and Inspire, both reaching number fifty on the Oricon chart. Her eleventh studio album Who Loves Me was released in October 2021, managing to peak at number 25 in Japan.

Albums

Studio albums

Compilation albums

Collaborative albums

Cover albums

Remix albums

Tribute albums

Video albums

Extended plays

Singles

As lead artist

As featured artist

Promotional singles

Other charted songs

Guest appearances

See also
 Shota Shimizu

Notes

References

Discographies of Japanese artists
Pop music discographies
Rhythm and blues discographies